The following is a timeline of the history of the city of Siena, Tuscany, Italy.

Prior to 15th century

 1st C. CE – Saena Julia founded by Romans.
 1205 – Palazzo Tolomei built (approximate date).
 1233 - "The people again rose against the nobles in the hope of ousting them entirely from office."
 1240 – University of Siena established.
 1248 - Plague.
 1255
 Gran Tavola bank founded.
 Basilica of San Francesco built.
 1260 – Battle of Montaperti.
 1263 – Siena Cathedral built.
 1265 – Basilica of San Domenico built.
 1287 – Noveschi in power.
 1308 – Palazzo Pubblico built.
 1328 – Famine.
 1348
 Black Death plague.
 Torre del Mangia built.
 1349 - Piazza del Campo paved in fishbone-patterned red brick.
 1355 - Arrival of Charles IV, Holy Roman Emperor in Siena
 1360 – Public clock installed.

15th century
 1419 - Fonte Gaia built.
 1423 - Council of Siena begins.
 1438 - Loggia della Mercanzia built (approximate date).
 1459 – Palazzo Marsili rebuilt.
 1462 – Loggia del Papa erected.
 1463 – Palazzo Piccolomini-delle Papesse built.
 1472
 Monte dei Paschi di Siena founded.
 Palazzo Spannocchi built (approximate date).
 1478 - The Pazzi conspiracy led to war a war lasting to 1480.
 1482 & 1483 - Riots.
 1484 – Printing press in operation.
 1490 – Basilica dell'Osservanza built (approximate date).
 1495
 Palazzo delle Papesse completed (approximate date).
 Piccolomini Library built (approximate date).

16th–18th centuries

 1504 – Santo Spirito renovated.
 1506 – Palazzo Chigi-Saracini renovated.
 1508 – Palazzo del Magnifico built.
 1520 – Palazzo Bichi built (approximate date).
 1527 – Accademia degli Intronati founded (approximate date).
 1533 – Santa Maria dei Servi consecrated.
 1554 – Battle of Marciano.
 1555 – Republic of Siena surrenders to Spain; Siena ceded to Duchy of Florence.
 1604 – Porta Camollia rebuilt.
 1613 – San Martino renovated.
 1656 – Palio di Siena horse race begins.
 1691 – Accademia dei Fisiocritici founded.
 1729 – Consolidation of districts; elimination of contrade Gallo, Leone, Orso, Quercia, Spadaforte, and Vipera.

19th century
 1816 
 Fine Arts Institution founded.
 The natural history museum of the Royal Academy of the Physiocritics founded.
 1848 – Palazzo Buonsignori restored.
 1854 – Palazzo del Capitano restored.
 1856 – Orto Botanico dell'Università di Siena laid out.
 1858 – Municipal Archivio instituted.
 1865 – Empoli-Siena railway begins operating.
 1866 – Cemetery della Misericordia established.
 1871 – Mens Sana in Corpore Sano 1871 formed.
 1897 – Population: 30,468.

20th century

 1901 – Population: 25,539.
 1904 – Società Studio e Divertimento formed.
 1911 – Population: 41,673.
 1923 – Stadio Artemio Franchi – Montepaschi Arena opens.
 1932
 Accademia Musicale Chigiana founded.
 Pinacoteca Nazionale inaugurated.
 1935 – Siena railway station opens.
 1944 – Bombing by Allies.
 1959 – Biblioteca Comunale degli Intronati (library) active.
 1976 – Palasport Mens Sana arena opens.
 1995 – Santa Maria della Scala museum opens.

21st century

 2003
 Fondazione Musei Senesi established.
 Siena–Ampugnano Airport renovated.

See also
 Siena history
 
 List of Governors of Siena
 List of mayors of Siena
 Republic of Siena, 11th–16th centuries
  (state archives)

Other cities in the macroregion of Central Italy:(it)
 Timeline of Ancona, Marche region
 Timeline of Arezzo, Tuscany region
 Timeline of Florence, Tuscany
 Timeline of Livorno, Tuscany
 Timeline of Lucca, Tuscany
 Timeline of Perugia, Umbria region
 Timeline of Pisa, Tuscany
 Timeline of Pistoia, Tuscany
 Timeline of Prato, Tuscany
 Timeline of Rome, Lazio region

References

Further reading

 
 
 
 
 
 
 

 
siena